Hayton may refer to:

Armenian name

Հեթում  (also Het'um, Haithon, Hethoum, Hetum), an Armenian given name
 King Hethum I, King of Armenia (d. 1271)
 King Hethum II, King of Armenia (1266–1307)
Hayton of Corycus (c. 1235 – c. 1310), Armenian monk and writer

Surname
Lennie Hayton (1908–1971), American composer and conductor
Barrett Hayton (*2000), Canadian ice hockey player

Places
United Kingdom
Hayton, Allerdale, Cumbria, England
Hayton, Carlisle, Cumbria, England
Hayton, East Riding of Yorkshire, England
Hayton, Nottinghamshire, England
Hayton, Aberdeenshire, Scotland. See List of United Kingdom locations: Has-Hd

United States
Hayton, Wisconsin